Olivier Martini (born 26 May 1965) is a Monegasque fencer. He competed in the individual sabre events at the 1984 and 1988 Summer Olympics.

He was part of the Monegasque delegation to the World University Games in 1987.

References

External links
 
 Monaco, Vivre ma ville. Maire de Monaco. Issue 54. December 2017.

1965 births
Living people
Monegasque male sabre fencers
Olympic fencers of Monaco
Fencers at the 1984 Summer Olympics
Fencers at the 1988 Summer Olympics